Thomas McGee may refer to:

Thomas D'Arcy McGee (1825–1868), Irish–Canadian politician
Thomas M. McGee (born 1955), Mayor of Lynn, Massachusetts
Thomas W. McGee (1924–2012), speaker of the Massachusetts House of Representatives
Tommy McGee (born 1979), Scottish rugby union footballer